Oula is a village and the administrative centre (chef-lieu) of the commune of Songo-Doubacoré in the Cercle of Koutiala in the Sikasso Region of southern Mali. The village is 26 km northeast of Koutiala.

References

Populated places in Sikasso Region